Sincerely is the fourteenth studio album by Cliff Richard, released in 1969. It is his twenty-sixth album overall.

The album reached number 24 in the UK Album Charts in a 3 week run in the top 40.

Track listing
"In the Past" (Mick Cahill)
"Always" (Terry Britten)
"Will You Love Me Tomorrow" (Carole King, Gerry Goffin)
"You'll Want Me" (Roger Cook, Roger Greenaway)
"I'm Not Getting Married" (Albert Hammond, Mike Hazlewood)
"Time" (Michael Merchant)
"For Emily, Whenever I May Find Her" (Paul Simon)
"Baby I Could Be So Good At Loving You" (Buzz Clifford)
"Sam" (Mitch Murray, Peter Callander)
"London's Not Too Far" (Hank Marvin)
"Take Action" (Terry Britten)
"Take Good Care of Her" (Arthur Kent, Ed Warren)
"When I Find You"" (Jimmy Campbell)
"Punch and Judy" (Mike D'Abo)

Personnel
Taken from the sleeve notes, as follows:

 Mike Leander - arranger and conductor, tracks 1, 2, 7, 8, 10, 14
 Brian Bennett - arranger, track 3; arranger and conductor, tracks 4, 11
 Mike Vickers - arranger and conductor, tracks 5, 13
 Bernard Ebbinghouse - arranger and conductor, tracks 6
 Alan Hawkshaw - arranger and conductor, tracks 9, 12
 Norrie Paramor - conductor, track 3; producer
 Cliff Richard - Lead vocals

External links

References

1969 albums
Cliff Richard albums
Albums produced by Norrie Paramor
EMI Columbia Records albums